Pityogenes is a genus of typical bark beetles in the family Curculionidae. There are more than 30 described species in Pityogenes.

Species
These 39 species belong to the genus Pityogenes:

 Pityogenes aizawai Kono, 1938b
 Pityogenes albanicus Apfelbeck, 1896
 Pityogenes baicalicus Eggers
 Pityogenes bialowiezensis Karpinski, 1931
 Pityogenes bidentatus Wood & Bright, 1992 (two-toothed pine beetle)
 Pityogenes bistridentatus Wood & Bright, 1992
 Pityogenes calcaratus Eichhoff, 1878
 Pityogenes carinulatus Wood & Bright, 1992
 Pityogenes carniolica Fuchs, 1911a
 Pityogenes chalcographus (Linnaeus & C., 1760)
 Pityogenes conjunctus Reitter, 1887b
 Pityogenes fossifrons Wood & Bright, 1992
 Pityogenes foveolatus Eggers, 1926b
 Pityogenes herbellae Strohmeyer & H., 1929b
 Pityogenes hopkinsi Swaine, 1915 (chestnut-brown bark beetle)
 Pityogenes irkutensis Eggers
 Pityogenes japonicus Nobuchi, 1974
 Pityogenes knechteli Swaine, 1918
 Pityogenes lecontei Swaine & J.M., 1915a
 Pityogenes lepidus Wichmann & H.E., 1914c
 Pityogenes meridianus Blackman, 1921
 Pityogenes mexicanus Wood, 1980b
 Pityogenes monacensis Fuchs, 1911a
 Pityogenes niger Sokanovskii & B.V., 1960
 Pityogenes nitidus Eggers, 1941b
 Pityogenes obtusus Eggers
 Pityogenes opacifrons Reitter, 1913a
 Pityogenes pennidens Wood & Bright, 1992
 Pityogenes perfossus Beeson, 1961
 Pityogenes pilidens Reitter, 1894a
 Pityogenes plagiatus Bright, 1976d
 Pityogenes porifrons Eggers
 Pityogenes quadridens Hartig, 1834
 Pityogenes rudnevi Sokanovskii & B.V., 1959a
 Pityogenes saalasi Eggers, 1914
 Pityogenes scitus Blandford, 1893b
 Pityogenes seirindensis Murayama, 1929c
 Pityogenes spessivtsevi Lebedev, 1926
 Pityogenes trepanatus Wood & Bright, 1992

References

Further reading

External links

 

Scolytinae
Articles created by Qbugbot